The Our Lady Queen of Africa Cathedral or Cathedral of El Obeid is a religious building belonging to the Catholic Church, and functions as a cathedral located in the town of El Obeid, capital of North Kordofan, in the heart of the African country of Sudan.

The cathedral follows the Latin Rite or Roman Rite and also is the seat of the bishop of the diocese of El Obeid (Latin: Elobeidensis Dioecesis) that was created on December 12, 1974, by the Bull "Cum in Sudania" of Pope Paul VI. Its construction work was completed in 1871. It was reopened in 1948 during the government of Anglo Egyptian Sudan.

See also
Roman Catholicism in Sudan

References

Roman Catholic cathedrals in Sudan
El-Obeid
Roman Catholic churches completed in 1871
19th-century Roman Catholic church buildings